Larry Lynn Foster (born December 24, 1937) is an American former professional baseball player. The right-handed pitcher attended Michigan State University before signing a professional contract with the Detroit Tigers prior to the 1958 season. He had an eight-season professional career, but appeared in only one Major League game for the Tigers on September 18, 1963.

In that game, against the Minnesota Twins at Metropolitan Stadium, Foster pitched the sixth and seventh innings in relief of Willie Smith. He gave up four hits and three earned runs, with a double by Don Mincher as the most damaging blow. He issued one walk and struck out one.

After retiring from baseball in 1965, Foster became a Lutheran pastor, at one point serving at Grace Lutheran Church in his home city of Lansing.

References

External links
Career record and playing statistics from Baseball Reference

1937 births
Living people
American Lutherans
Baseball players from Michigan
Denver Bears players
Detroit Tigers players
Knoxville Smokies players
Major League Baseball pitchers
Sportspeople from Lansing, Michigan
Reading Indians players
Seattle Rainiers players
Syracuse Chiefs players